The 2021–22 Virginia Tech Hokies men's basketball team represented Virginia Polytechnic Institute and State University during the 2021–22 NCAA Division I men's basketball season. The Hokies are led by third-year head coach Mike Young and played their home games at Cassell Coliseum in Blacksburg, Virginia, as members of the Atlantic Coast Conference. They finished the season 23–13, 11–9 in ACC play to finish in seventh place. As the No. 7 seed, they defeated Clemson, Notre Dame, North Carolina, and Duke to win the ACC tournament. They received the conference’s automatic bid to the NCAA tournament as the No. 11 seed in the East Region, where they lost in the first round to Texas.

Previous season
The Hokies finished the 2020–21 season 15–7, 9–4 in ACC play, to finish in third place. They lost to North Carolina in the quarterfinals of the ACC tournament after earning a double-bye into the quarterfinals. They received an at-large bid to the NCAA tournament as the No. 10 seed in the South Region where they lost to Florida in the first round.

Offseason

Departures

Incoming transfers

2021 recruiting class

2022 Recruiting class

Roster

Schedule and results

Source:

|-
!colspan=12 style=| Regular season

|-
!colspan=12 style=| ACC tournament

|-
!colspan=12 style=| NCAA tournament

Rankings

*AP does not release post-NCAA tournament rankings^Coaches did not release a Week 1 poll.

References

Virginia Tech Hokies men's basketball seasons
Virginia Tech
Virginia Tech
Virginia Tech
Virginia Tech